Zimmer's conjecture is a statement in mathematics "which has to do with the circumstances under which geometric spaces exhibit certain kinds of symmetries." It was named after the mathematician Robert Zimmer.  The conjecture states that there can exist symmetries (specifically higher-rank lattices) in a higher dimension that cannot exist in lower dimensions.

In 2017, the conjecture was proven by Aaron Brown and Sebastián Hurtado-Salazar of the University of Chicago and David Fisher of Indiana University.

References 

Symmetry
Conjectures that have been proved